Substantivism is a position, first proposed by Karl Polanyi in his work The Great Transformation (1944), which argues that the term "economics" has two meanings.  The formal meaning, used by today's neoclassical economists, refers to economics as the logic of rational action and decision-making, as rational choice between the alternative uses of limited (scarce) means, as "economizing", "maximizing", or "optimizing".

The second, substantive meaning presupposes neither rational decision-making nor conditions of scarcity. It refers to how humans make a living interacting within their social and natural environments. A society's livelihood strategy is seen as an adaptation to its environment and material conditions, a process which may or may not involve utility maximization. The substantive meaning of 'economics' is seen in the broader sense of 'provisioning.'  Economics is the way society meets material needs.

See also
 Economic anthropology
 Formalist–substantivist debate

References

Economic anthropology
Philosophy of economics